Performance Driving is categorized as a driver of an automobile utilizing specific techniques to maximize the performance potential (See also vehicle dynamics) of the automobile during acceleration, turning, and braking maneuvers, typically while driving at a facility dedicated——and specifically constructed——to host automobile motorsport competitive events.

"Performance Driving" may also be called "Car Control", and the skills can be learned in a variety of ways:
Books describing the techniques
Videos/ DVDs demonstrating the techniques
Attending a school organized specifically to teach the techniques

Methods utilized:
Separation of Controls
Brake
Throttle
Steering
Vision/ Use of Eyes
Visualization
Anticipation
Muscle Memory
Practice techniques

The raison d'être for this technique is the performance characteristics of the modern automotive tire. The tires on your car have a specific maximum amount of grip (one component of 'grip' being friction). The tire is also load sensitive——that is the maximum grip developed at any instant in time is dependent upon the force applied at the tire to tarmac interface. The driver has great influence upon the load on a given tire and also the rate at which that load is applied to the tire.

Motorsport
Driving
Driving techniques